Al Wohlman  was a film and theatre actor; he was also a vaudeville performer.

Biography

Wohlamn appeared in Fanchon & Marcos' Satires of 1920, and a Broadway-theatre production of the musical revue The Girl from Gay Paree (1926–1927) at the Winter Garden Theatre in New York City, New York.

He then appeared in Doctor of Melody (1929).

Discography
Al Wohlman and the Gay Boys

Oliver Naylor — Oliver Naylor and His Seven Aces (1924–1925)
Josephine Baker — Un Message Pour Toi (1926–1937)

References

External links

Year of birth missing
American male film actors
American male stage actors
Vaudeville performers
Year of death missing